A Dictionary of Love, Or, the Language of Gallantry Explained is a dictionary originally compiled by the British author John Cleland in 1753 and revised in 1777 and 1795, though there is no evidence that Cleland was involved with the revisions. It continued to appear in reprints until 1825. It explains the words used by lovers in conversation and courtship in an 'unsentimental' way, cynically interpreting the terms to suggest that readers should not take lovers' words literally.

Cleland produced the dictionary as a partial translation of the French Dictionnaire d’Amour of 1741 by Jean-François Dreux du Radier, with the addition of his own entries, which comprise about a quarter of the entries, and about a fifth of the contents of the original omitted. The dictionary was originally published as an anonymous work by Ralph Griffiths, also the publisher of Cleland's novel Fanny Hill, and Griffiths reviewed the book himself in his journal, the Monthly Review. Because of the lack of attribution, its authorship was unknown for many years, but in 1979 Roger Lonsdale discovered a note by Griffiths in his own copy of the review, identifying 'Mr Cleland' as the author.

References

External links 
 Online searchable version of Dictionary of Love

1753 books
Dictionaries by subject